Leslie Bolton (22 November 1909 – 4 December 1986) was a Danish footballer. He played in one match for the Denmark national football team in 1938.

References

External links
 

1909 births
1986 deaths
Danish men's footballers
Denmark international footballers
People from Gentofte Municipality
Association football defenders
Hellerup IK players
Boldklubben af 1893 players